Acrocercops urbanella is a moth of the family Gracillariidae. It is known from Colombia.

References

urbanella
Moths described in 1877
Gracillariidae of South America